is a Japanese manga series written and illustrated by Naoshi Arakawa. It was serialized in Kodansha's Magazine E-no from June 2009 to August 2010, and collected in two tankōbon volumes. The series is published in print and in digital in North America by Kodansha USA.

An anime film adaptation of the series by Liden Films, titled Farewell, My Dear Cramer: First Touch, premiered in June 2021.

Media

Manga
The series is written and illustrated by Naoshi Arakawa. It was serialized in Kodansha's Magazine E-no from June 20, 2009, to August 20, 2010. Its chapters were compiled into two tankōbon volumes.

Kodansha USA is publishing the series digitally and in print.

Volume list

Film
An anime film adaptation of the series, titled , was announced. The film is animated by Liden Films and directed by Seiki Takuno, with Natsuko Takahashi writing the script, and Masaru Yokoyama composing the music. It was originally set to premiere on April 1, 2021, but it was delayed to June 11, 2021. The staff said it was due to "unforeseen circumstances", but they also expressed hope of the new coronavirus getting contained. Crunchyroll streamed the film outside of Asia. In Southeast Asia, Muse Communication licensed the film.

Reception
The series was nominated for the Mangawa award in the shōnen category in 2017.

Caitlin Moore from Anime News Network praised the series, praising it for its "highly technical soccer action" and treatment of gender issues in sports, while criticizing the art for faces. Koiwai and Takato from Manga News also gave the series praise, calling it "finely presented".

References

External links
  
 

Anime postponed due to the COVID-19 pandemic
Anime films based on manga
Association football in anime and manga
Crunchyroll anime
Films postponed due to the COVID-19 pandemic
Kodansha manga
Liden Films
Muse Communication
School life in anime and manga
Shōnen manga